Tokyo Rose is a 1989 album by American musician Van Dyke Parks. The album concerns the intersection between Japanese and American cultures, particularly as reflected in the competitive "Trade War" of the 1980s. The intersection between the two cultures is nowhere more obvious than in the album's first song, "America", an adaptation of "America (My Country, 'Tis of Thee)" with numerous pentatonic shifts characteristic of Japanese music, played on a combination of standard Western instruments and traditional Japanese instruments, such as the biwa and the koto.

Track listing 
All songs written by Van Dyke Parks, except track 1, which is public domain, arranged and adapted by Parks; track 10, Japanese lyrics by Amy Furumoto.

 "America" – 3:47
 "Tokyo Rose" – 5:08
 "Yankee Go Home" (features vocal of Danny Hutton) – 6:27
 "Cowboy" – 4:35
 "Manzanar" – 6:02
 "Calypso" (features vocal of Mari Iijima) – 4:27
 "White Chrysanthemum" – 4:00
 "Trade War" – 4:40
 "Out of Love" – 3:18
 "One Home Run" – 4:00

Personnel
 Van Dyke Parks – vocals, bass
 Todd Hayen – orchestrator, conductor
 Osamu Kitajima – biwa, koto
 Masakazu Yoshizawa – shakuhachi
 Bobby King – vocals
 Syd Straw – vocals
 Kathy Dalton – vocals
 Israel Baker – concert master
 Dennis Budimir – guitar
 Julie Christensen – vocals
 Terry Evans – vocals
 William "Bill" Greene – vocals
 Danny Hutton – vocals
 Hiromitsu Katada – narimono
 Buell Neidlinger – bass
 Akira Tana – drums
 Mike Watts – programming
 Arnold McCuller – vocals
 Mari Iijima – vocals
 Brian Otto – guitar
 Lisa Popeil – vocals

See also 
 Tokyo Rose

References 

1989 albums
Van Dyke Parks albums
Warner Records albums